Geocrypta galii is a species of fly in the family Cecidomyiidae. It is found in the Palearctic.  The larvae gall Rubiaceae.

References

External links 
Images representing  Cecidomyiidae at BOLD

Cecidomyiidae
Insects described in 1850
Nematoceran flies of Europe
Taxa named by Hermann Loew